The 1959 Rhineland-Palatinate state election was conducted on 19 April 1959 to elect members to the Landtag, the state legislature of Rhineland-Palatinate, West Germany.

|-
|colspan=15| 
|-
!style="background-color:#E9E9E9;text-align:left;" width=300px colspan=2|Party
!style="background-color:#E9E9E9;text-align:right;" width=50px |Vote %
!style="background-color:#E9E9E9;text-align:right;" width=50px |Vote % ±
!style="background-color:#E9E9E9;text-align:right;" width=50px |Seats
!style="background-color:#E9E9E9;text-align:right;" width=50px |Seats ±
|-
| width=5px style="background-color: " |
| style="text-align:left;" | Christian Democratic Union
| style="text-align:right;" | 48.4
| style="text-align:right;" | +1.6
| style="text-align:right;" | 52
| style="text-align:right;" | +1
|-
| style="background-color: " |
| style="text-align:left;" | Social Democratic Party
| style="text-align:right;" | 34.9
| style="text-align:right;" | +3.2
| style="text-align:right;" | 37
| style="text-align:right;" | +1
|-
| style="background-color: " |
| style="text-align:left;" | Free Democratic Party
| style="text-align:right;" | 9.7
| style="text-align:right;" | –3.0
| style="text-align:right;" | 10
| style="text-align:right;" | –3
|-
| style="background-color: " |
| style="text-align:left;" | Deutsche Reichspartei
| style="text-align:right;" | 5.1
| style="text-align:right;" | N/A
| style="text-align:right;" | 1
| style="text-align:right;" | N/A
|-
| style="background-color: " |
| style="text-align:left;" | Others
| style="text-align:right;" | 1.9
| style="text-align:right;" | –3.7
| style="text-align:right;" | 0
| style="text-align:right;" | ±0
|- style="background: #E9E9E9"
! style="text-align:left;" colspan=2| Total
| 100.0
| —
| 100
| ±0
|-
| colspan=9 style="text-align:left;" | Source: parties-and-elections.de
|}

1959
1959 elections in Germany
1959 in West Germany